Crime in Pakistan is present in various forms and occurs everywhere, especially in the many major cities such as Karachi, Lahore, Faisalabad, Rawalpindi, Gujranwala, Peshawar, Multan,  Hyderabad, Islamabad and Quetta. Among other general crimes, it includes major crimes such as murder, rape, gang rape, sexual abuse of a minor, kidnapping, armed robbery, burglary and carjacking. For example, in the city of Lahore 379 murders, 500 attempted murders, 2,650 abductions and 55 rapes have occurred in 2019.

Organised crime

Organised crime in Pakistan includes fraud, racketeering, drug trafficking, smuggling, money laundering, extortion, ransom, political violence, etc. Terrorist attacks became common during the 2000s, especially in North-West Frontier Province, the Federally Administered Tribal Areas, Balochistan, Karachi and Lahore. Vehicle theft is common, particularly in the large cities.

Opium production

Pakistan falls under the Golden Crescent, which is one of the two major illicit opium producing centres in Asia. Opium poppy cultivation in Pakistan is estimated to be 800 hectares in 2005 yielding a potential production of 4 metric tons of heroin. Opium has been historically cultivated primarily in Khyber Pakhtunkhwa, in the areas near the border with Afghanistan. Until the late 1970s, opium production levels were relatively static; it increased after 1979. An estimated $4 billion is generated from drug trafficking in Pakistan.

Crimes against women

Corruption and police misconduct

See also
Pakistan Penal Code
Capital punishment in Pakistan
Human trafficking in Pakistan
Gambling in Pakistan
Human rights in Pakistan
Law enforcement in Pakistan
Rape in Pakistan
Targeted killings in Pakistan
Honour killing in Pakistan
Sectarian violence in Pakistan
Religious discrimination in Pakistan
Terrorism in Pakistan
List of terrorist incidents in Pakistan since 2001

References

Works cited

External links
Crime (Samaa TV)
Pakistan forgiveness laws: The price of getting away with murder (BBC News, Jan. 6, 2020)
The Socio-Economic Determinants of Crime in Pakistan: New Evidence on an Old Debate (ScienceDirect, Oct. 2015)
Drugged up Pakistan: A billion dollar narcotics trade (Al Jazeera English, Oct. 10, 2014)
Pakistan Economic and Social Review Volume 47, No. 1 (Summer 2009), pp. 79–98